Bhartekunta is a mountain of the Garhwal Himalaya in Uttarakhand India.The elevation of Bhartekunta is  and its prominence is . It is 69th highest located entirely within the Uttrakhand. Nanda Devi, is the highest mountain in this category. It lies between Kirti Stambh and Kedarnath (mountain). Its nearest higher neighbor Kedarnath (mountain)  lies 3 km ESE. It is located 2.3 km SE of Kirti Stambh  and 6.9 km north lies Meru Peak .

Climbing history
INDO-TIBET BORDER POLICE (ITBP) claimed the first ascent of Bhartekunta led by B.C. Khulbey on 6 June 1975.  A Spanish club de Esquí de La Molina, Girona, of Spain climbed Bhartekunta on 27 September climbers are Toni Bou, Kiko Colo, Josep Ximenis and Joan Sala.
Bhartekunta was attempted by An Indian team led by Romesh Bhattacharjee from the Gangotri Glacier. They reached a high point of 6450 meters.

Glaciers and rivers
Kirti Bamak lies on the NE side of Bhartekunta. On the SW side lies Bhartekunta Bamak. On the SE side lies Kedarnath Glacier. Kirti Bamak joins Gangotri glacier. Bhagirathi River comes out from the snout of Gangotri Glacier. Bhagirathi River is one of the main tributaries of river Ganga, which later joins Alaknanda river the other main tributaries of river Ganga at Dev Prayag and became Ganga there after. On the other side Bhartekunta Bamak drain down to Bhilangana River which later joins Bhagirathi River near Tehri Dam. Mandakini River emerges from Kedarnath glacier and joins Alaknanda River at Rudra Prayag.

Neighboring peaks 
neighboring peaks of Bhartekunta: 
 Chaukhamba I: 
 Bhagirathi I: 
 Kedarnath Peak: 
 Kedarnath Dome: 
 Sumeru Parbat: 
 Mandani Parbat:

See also

 List of Himalayan peaks of Uttarakhand

References

Mountains of Uttarakhand
Six-thousanders of the Himalayas
Geography of Chamoli district